

Men's tournament

Elimination round

Team standings

Schedule

Bracket

Fourth–seed playoff

Semifinals

UST vs. UP

|-
!colspan=10|UST advances to the Finals

FEU vs. Ateneo

|-
!colspan=10|FEU advances to the Finals

Finals

|-
!colspan=10|UST wins series 2–0

Awardees

 Finals MVP:  Henry James Pecaña (University of Santo Tomas)
 Most Valuable Player:  Andre Joseph Pareja (Ateneo de Manila University)
 Rookie of the Year: Christopher Michael Antonio (De La Salle University)
 Best Blocker:  Lloyd Arden Belgado (University of the Philippines Diliman)
 Best Digger:  Amenolah Acot (University of the East)
 Best Receiver:  Richard Rosero (National University)
 Best Scorer:  Chris Macasaet (De La Salle University)
 Best Server:  Ray Karl Dimaculangan (University of Santo Tomas)
 Best Setter:  Gerald Magtoto (University of the Philippines Diliman)
 Best Spiker:  Andre Joseph Pareja (Ateneo de Manila University)

Women's tournament

Elimination round

Team standings

Schedule

Results
Results to the right and top of the black cells are first round games, those to the left and below are second round games.

Bracket

Semifinals

La Salle vs. Adamson

|-
!colspan=10|La Salle advances to the Finals

UST vs. Ateneo

|-
!colspan=10|UST advances to the Finals

Finals

|-
!colspan=10|UST wins series 2-0

Awardees

 Finals MVP:  Rhea Katrina Dimaculangan (University of Santo Tomas)
 Most Valuable Player:  Cherry May Vivas (Far Eastern University)
 Rookie of the Year:  Joanne Siy (De La Salle University)
 Best Blocker:  Joanne Siy (De La Salle University)
 Best Digger:  Lizlee Ann Gata (Adamson University)
 Best Receiver:  Lizlee Ann Gata (Adamson University)
 Best Scorer:  Cherry May Vivas (Far Eastern University)
 Best Server:  Rhea Katrina Dimaculangan (University of Santo Tomas)
 Best Setter:  Jamenea Ferrer (Ateneo de Manila University)
 Best Spiker:  Ma. Paulina Soriano (Adamson University)

2009 in Philippine sport
2010 in Philippine sport
UAAP Season 72
UAAP volleyball tournaments